Ioseb Ivanesh Chugoshvili (born July 29, 1986 in Telavi, Georgia) is an amateur Belarusian Greco-Roman wrestler of Georgian origin, who competes in the men's super heavyweight category. Chugoshvili represented Belarus at the 2012 Summer Olympics in London, where he competed in the 120 kg class, an event which was dominated by defending Olympic champion Mijaín López of Cuba. He was eliminated in his first preliminary match against Estonia's Heiki Nabi, with a technical score of 1–4 after two periods, and a classification score of 1–3. Because Nabi advanced further into the final match against López, Chugoshvili offered another shot for an Olympic bronze medal through the repechage bouts. He first defeated Poland's Łukasz Banak, but lost the bronze medal match to Sweden's Johan Euren, who stopped him with a par terre position in order to score a point each in two out of three periods.

References

External links
FILA Profile

Belarusian male sport wrestlers
1986 births
Living people
Olympic wrestlers of Belarus
Wrestlers at the 2012 Summer Olympics
People from Telavi
Sportspeople from Minsk
European Games bronze medalists for Belarus
European Games medalists in wrestling
Wrestlers at the 2015 European Games
Male sport wrestlers from Georgia (country)
European Wrestling Championships medalists
20th-century Belarusian people
21st-century Belarusian people